"Stronger Than Me" is a song recorded by American country music singer Garth Brooks. It was released on November 19, 2018, as second single from Brooks' fourteenth studio album Fun. The song was written by Bobby Terry and Matt Rossi. His wife Trisha Yearwood also participated chorus.

Background
Brooks debuted the song during the 2018 CMA Awards, and mentioned the song tributed to wife Trisha Yearwood. The song is a love song dedicated to his wife.

Content
Brooks said at Popculture: "There are points in your life you never get across," "You both just get to this point, where you argue and argue and then you just get exhausted, and you're done, and that's kind of our way. We have two or three points in our life like that." "That song addresses two of those three points, so I noticed when I looked up at her, at those points, she was kind of laughing, smiling, and crying at the same time," "so this song's going to actually make our relationship better, whether it does anything in the business or not."

Charts

Weekly charts

Year-end charts

References

2018 singles
2018 songs
Garth Brooks songs